São Caetano de Odivelas is a municipality in the state of Pará in the Northern region of Brazil.

The municipal seat lies on the left (west) bank of the Barreto River.
It contains the  Mocapajuba Marine Extractive Reserve, created in 2014.

See also
List of municipalities in Pará

References

Municipalities in Pará
Populated coastal places in Pará